The SIAM Journal on Matrix Analysis and Applications (until 1989: SIAM Journal on Algebraic and Discrete Methods) is a peer-reviewed scientific journal covering matrix analysis and its applications. The relevant applications include signal processing, systems and control theory, statistics, Markov chains, mathematical biology, graph theory, and data science. 

The journal is published by the Society for Industrial and Applied Mathematics. The founding editor-in-chief was Gene H. Golub, who established the journal in 1980. The current editor is Michele Benzi (Scuola Normale Superiore).

See also 
Michele Benzi

External links
 

Mathematics journals
Publications established in 1980
English-language journals
Quarterly journals
Matrix Analysis and Applications